Bourke Street is a main street in the central business district of Melbourne.

Bourke Street may also refer to:

 Bourke Street (painting), an 1886 painting by Tom Roberts
 Bourke Street Wesleyan Chapel, a heritage-listed chapel at 348a Bourke Street in Darlinghurst, Sydney

See also
 January 2017 Melbourne car attack, known colloquially as the "Bourke Street rampage"